Bernard Finegan Gribble (10 May 1872 – 21 February 1962) was a prolific British marine artist and illustrator.

Life and works 

Gribble was born in Chelsea in 1872. His father Herbert A. K. Gribble ARIBA was an architect known for his design of the Brompton Oratory. Gribble was set to follow in his father's footsteps but instead elected to become a full-time painter in oils and watercolours. He was educated at the College of St Francis Saviour, Bruges, Belgium; South Kensington Art School; and under Albert Toft. He married Eleanor Mabel Clunn (nicknamed "Nellie"). They settled in Poole, Dorset, sometime between 1915 and 1924 (or perhaps in the 1930s), living at 3 Springfield Crescent, Parkstone. He became a member — along with Henry Lamb and Augustus John — of the Poole and East Dorset Art Society.

Although his work included landscapes of Poole and portraits, Gribble was best known as a painter of historical (and often romanticised) maritime scenes. It was once suggested that he had painted "almost every historic event that took place on water, from the landing of William the Conqueror to the Scuttling of the German fleet in Scapa Flow in 1919". Spanish galleons and treasure vessels are well represented in his work, and one critic described him as a "specialist in burning ships". Others compared his paintings to the fine marine vistas of the late 19th-century seascape artist, Henry Moore, acknowledging Gribble's skill in the accurate portrayal of costume and technical detail and his ability to convey an authentic period atmosphere.(1)

In his preparatory sketches of ships, Gribble made notes on the precise structure and names of sails, masts, and rigging. He had studied the movement of water closely, and made highly technical analyses of the construction of rigging and sails to a level where it naturally informed his naval subjects. He also paid close attention to the detail of costume. The evident quality of Gribble's marine pictures lies in the artist's mastery of the oil painting medium adapted to a profound understanding of his chosen subject.(2)

Gribble exhibited regularly at the Royal Academy and the Paris Salon, and his paintings were widely sought after. Franklin D. Roosevelt was one of many celebrity owners of Gribble paintings. He purchased a painting showing the arrival of American destroyers at Queenstown in Ireland, during World War I. It hung in the Oval Office of the White House when Roosevelt became United States President in 1933. The President reputedly suggested the painting's name —The Return of the Mayflower — to the artist. Roosevelt also purchased Surrender of the German Fleet to the Grand Fleet at Scapa Flow. Gribble had been one of the few civilian witnesses to this event in 1918; in his capacity as Official Maritime Painter to the Shipwrights' Company. Both works are believed to have been painted in 1919.(3)

Other notable purchasers of Gribble paintings included Queen Mary, the German Kaiser, and Jackie Onassis. The Kaiser was so impressed by Gribble's work that King George V summoned the artist to a royal residence to meet him.

Gribble was in demand as an illustrator, and his work appeared in many leading magazines, including The Illustrated London News and The Graphic. He illustrated numerous books and other items, including royal postcards and chocolate boxes.

After his death in 1962, his widow donated many of his works to Poole Museum, which now possesses the world's largest collection of Gribbles. The collection numbers 250 paintings, drawings, prints and photographs. Typical paintings in the Poole collection are The Plague Ship, The Whelp of the Black Rover and The Return of the Argosy Galleons, but there are also some local topographical works such as depictions of the Guildhall, the Custom House, views of the Quay and harbour, a portrait of former Mayor of Poole, Herbert Carter, in civic regalia, and one of a woman believed to be Gribble's wife Nellie.

Although Gribble's work has been out of fashion for some decades, Poole Museum has taken the opportunity provided by the First World War Centenary to reassess Gribble's art by staging an exhibition of his marine paintings, based on its collection and focusing on his war paintings. Part of the national centenary programme led by Imperial War Museums, the exhibition also includes loans from private and public collections, including the National Maritime Museum, and the highlight of these is a painting of the scuttling of the German Fleet at Scapa Flow, of which Gribble was an eye witness, from the Harris Museum and Art Gallery, Preston. The exhibition, titled Painting Drama at Sea, continued until February 2014.

Personal life and burial
Gribble is buried with his wife in Parkstone Cemetery, Poole, Dorset. They had no children.

Official purchases 

 Sinking of German Fleet, Scapa Flow 1918 (7 ft canvas) -- Preston Art Gallery and Museum
 The Doomed Fleet -- Bristol Museum and Art Gallery
 The Captain’s Last Landing -- Plymouth City Museum and Art Gallery
 No Surrender from the Pirate Captain—Plymouth City Museum and Art Gallery
  Departure of the Pilgrim Fathers—Plymouth City Museum and Art Gallery
 Market St, Poole -- Russell-Cotes Art Gallery & Museum, Bournemouth
 Bournemouth, Our Golden Argosies (canvas)—Presented by D Elliot Alves esq to the Federal Parliament House, Australia
 Surrender of the German Fleet 1918, United States Naval Academy, Annapolis
 The Mayflower’s Return, United States Naval War College, Rhode Island
 Two similar subjects to the above, President Roosevelt for the White House
 The Duchess of York Receiving the Freedom of the Worshipful Company of Shipwrights (4), National Maritime Museum, Greenwich

Sources and external links 
 
 The Paintings of Bernard Finnigan Gribble
 "No-one could paint the sea as well", Roger Guttridge, DorsetLife, Oct 2001
 
 Paintings fit for a President, Dorset Echo Jan 20 2001 
 Who’s Who in Art, The Art Trade Press, Ltd., 1962, 10th Edition
 

19th-century English painters
English male painters
20th-century English painters
English illustrators
British marine artists
1872 births
1962 deaths
Artists' Rifles soldiers
19th-century English male artists
20th-century English male artists